Jeff Hopgood (14 January 1948 – 8 November 2006) was an Australian rules footballer who played with North Melbourne in the Victorian Football League (VFL).

Hopgood spent six season at North Melbourne without ever managing to cement his spot, although he did manage 16 games in 1972. After leaving North Melbourne, Hopgood played at Coburg and was a ruckman in their 1974 VFA premiership side.
 
He later became influential in the Cairns sporting scene, serving as the president of AFL Cairns and the inaugural chairman of the Cairns Taipans basketball team, of which he was a co-founder.

Affectionately known as Hoppy, he was killed in November 2006 when his four-wheel drive crashed into a tree near the Gold Coast.

References

1948 births
North Melbourne Football Club players
Coburg Football Club players
Australian rules footballers from Victoria (Australia)
Australian rules football administrators
Road incident deaths in Queensland
2006 deaths